The 2023 Australian Formula Open - powered by Racefuels will be a multi-event open-wheel single seater motor racing championship. This will be the inaugural season of the championship, founded by two-time Australian Gold Star winner Tim Macrow as a direct successor to the Australian Formula 3 championship.

Drivers compete to win a S5000 test and free entry to a race in the S5000 Championship in 2024 or later.

Teams and drivers 
The championship will be structured in four classes. AFO1 encompasses all Formula 3 machinery, with several chassis and engine manufacturers represented. AFO2 caters to Toyota Racing Series, Formula Renault and older F3 cars. AFO3 serves all other invitational entries, while AFO4 is reserved for Formula 4 cars.

AFO1 entries

AFO2 entries

AFO4 entries

Race calendar 
The 2023 calendar was first announced on 20 December 2022. It is scheduled to consist of six rounds across six circuits all over Australia.

Race results

Standings

Scoring system 
Cars classified as finished in race 1 and 2 are awarded points by the following structure:

The third race of the weekend, the longer Feature Race, awards more points:

Overall championship

AFO1 championship

AFO2 championship

AFO4 championship

References 

Australian Formula Open
Australian Formula Open
Australian Formula Open